Tomorrow, in a Year is the studio version of the music commissioned by the Danish performance group Hotel Pro Forma for its opera based on Charles Darwin's On the Origin of Species. It is a collaboration between The Knife, Mt. Sims and Planningtorock. It was released digitally on 1 February 2010 through The Knife's own label Rabid Records prior to the physical release.

The lyrics contain excerpts of Darwin's writings, particularly On the Origin of Species. These are often without context, though the meaning of some songs is clear, for example 'Seeds' refers to Darwin's experiments to determine why certain plants are found on the coasts of many continents, despite their separation, in which he demonstrated that seeds of some plants remain viable after weeks in cold seawater, and 'Annie's Box' refers to the pivotal moment when Darwin's daughter Annie died of tuberculosis, which damaged his Christian faith, helping him to overcome his fears about the church's reaction to On the Origin of Species.

The music appears to have been composed to reflect the long arc of evolution, with the first songs having a hard, noisy and simple quality, subsequent tracks building in beauty and complexity, and incorporating progressively more lyrics and musical sounds based on animal vocalisations. Choreography was also inspired by animal behaviour including the courtship dances of birds. The opera was completed in 2009 to mark the 150th anniversary of the publication of On the Origin of Species and toured Europe in 2010.

The album was recorded, mixed and produced in Berlin, Stockholm and Copenhagen between 2008 and 2009. Recording for the live percussion took place at Sounds Studio in Iceland, while outdoor sounds were recorded at the Mamori Artlab Workshop on the Amazon River, Brazil. Tomorrow, In a Year features guest appearances by mezzo-soprano Kristina Wahlin, Danish actress Lærke Winther Andersen and Swedish pop artist Jonathan Johansson.

Track listing

Personnel
Credits for Tomorrow, In a Year adapted from album liner notes.

 The Knife – engineering, live percussion re-editing, mixing, production ; halldorophone re-editing ; vocals 
 Mt. Sims – engineering, live percussion re-editing, mixing, production ; halldorophone re-editing ; vocals 
 Planningtorock – engineering, live percussion re-editing, mixing, production ; vocals 
 Rashad Becker – mastering
 Johannes Berglund – vocal engineering 
 Bold Faces – artwork
 Kyle Gudmundson – live percussion engineering
 Hildur Guðnadóttir – halldorophone ; cello 
 Jonathan Johansson – vocals 
 Hjörleifur Jónsson – drums ; live percussion 
 Kristina Wahlin – vocals 
 Lærke Winther – vocals

Charts

Release history

Critical reception

Drownedinsound gave the studio album 10/10, describing it as "coldly overwhelming". Pitchfork reviewed the album 6.9/10, saying the album "either demands your full attention or invites you to turn it off". BBC Music described the album as "complicated, esoteric and, yes, really quite bonkers". The opera was rated 3/5 by the Guardian, with the reviewer criticising the harsh sound of the first several tracks, the very gradual introduction of vocals and the contextless way in which Darwin's writing was generally presented.

References

2010 albums
Concept albums
The Knife albums
Mute Records albums
Planningtorock albums